Very-long-chain acyl-CoA dehydrogenase (ACADVL (gene).) is an enzyme with systematic name very-long-chain acyl-CoA:electron-transfer flavoprotein 2,3-oxidoreductase. This enzyme catalyses the following chemical reaction

 a very-long-chain acyl-CoA + electron-transfer flavoprotein  a very-long-chain trans-2,3-dehydroacyl-CoA + reduced electron-transfer flavoprotein

This enzyme contains FAD as prosthetic group.

References

External links 
 

EC 1.3.8